Fongshan West–City Council is a station on the Orange line of the Kaohsiung MRT in Fongshan District, Kaohsiung, Taiwan.

Station overview
The station is a two-level, underground station with an island platform and two exits. The station is 214 meters long and is located at the intersection of Fongshan Zihyou Rd. and Cingnian 1st Rd.

Station Layout

Exits
Exit 1: Zihyou Rd.
Exit 2: Zihyou Rd., Cingnian Rd.

Around the station
 Fongshan Community Culture Museum
 Kaohsiung City Government
 Kaohsiung City Council
 National Feng-Shan Senior High School
 Zihyou Market

References

2008 establishments in Taiwan
Kaohsiung Metro Orange line stations
Railway stations opened in 2008